Lora Diane Fairclough (born 26 January 1970) is an English professional golfer. She was born in Chorley, Lancashire and turned professional in January 1991. She played on the Ladies European Tour, and won four individual tournaments on it. She made the top-10 on the Order of Merit five times between 1993 and 1999 and was a member of Europe's 1994 Solheim Cup team.

Professional wins (8)

Ladies European Tour wins (4)
1993 IBM Ladies' Open
1995 Ford Golf Classic, Ladies European Masters
1998 Ladies' German Open

Other wins (4)
1996 Lalla Meryem Cup, Ladies Mauritius Open
1999 Lalla Meryem Cup
2006 Women's Mauritius Open

Team appearances
Amateur
European Ladies' Team Championship (representing England): 1989
Vagliano Trophy (representing Great Britain & Ireland): 1989 (winners)

Professional
Solheim Cup (representing Europe): 1994

External links

English female golfers
Ladies European Tour golfers
LPGA Tour golfers
Solheim Cup competitors for Europe
Sportspeople from Chorley
1970 births
Living people